Chiridotea is a genus of isopod crustaceans in the family Chaetiliidae, containing the following species:
 Chiridotea almyra Bowman, 1955
 Chiridotea arenicola Wigley, 1960
 Chiridotea coeca (Say, 1818)
 Chiridotea excavata Harper, 1974
 Chiridotea tuftsii (Stimpson, 1853)

References

Valvifera